Those Love Pangs, also known as The Rival Mashers, is a 1914 American silent comedy film. It was produced by Keystone Studios and starred Charlie Chaplin and Chester Conklin.

Plot
The Tramp fights for the attention of the landlady with the Rival (played by Chester Conklin). The Rival makes his attempt first. While he is talking to the Landlady (played by Helen Carruthers), the Tramp pokes him with a fork from behind a curtain. The Rival gets upset and the landlady becomes annoyed. The Tramp goes on to talk to her. As the Tramp sweet talks the Landlady, the Rival does the same thing the Tramp did to him. The Landlady gets upset and walks away from the Tramp. Upset, the Tramp takes the Rival outside.

They eventually go their separate ways when the Tramp stays outside a bar and the Rival keeps walking toward a park. Before the Tramp goes into the bar, he is distracted by an attractive girl (Vivian Edwards) who walks past and glances at him. The Tramp follows her until her tall boyfriend appears. He runs away immediately.

Once at the park the Tramp finds the Rival being kissed by a girl (Cecile Arnold). The girl the Tramp had encountered before ends up at the park as well with her boyfriend. The Tramp becomes jealous of the other two men. He follows the two girls to a theater and sits between them. He finally has the attention of both girls and dozes off. The boyfriend and the Rival come into the theater to find the Tramp with their respective girlfriends, who run away immediately upon seeing their respective boyfriends. When the Tramp finally opens his eyes and realizes what is happening, he falls out of his chair, sending the whole audience into chaos. The film ends with the Tramp getting thrown into the screen.

Cast
 Charles Chaplin - The Tramp
 Chester Conklin - Rival
 Cecile Arnold - Blonde girl
 Vivian Edwards - Brunette girl
 Helen Carruthers - Landlady

Theme
Harry A. Grace published the article Charlie Chaplin's Films and American Culture Patterns in the Journal of Aesthetics and Art Criticism in which he analyzes Chaplin's films. He categorizes each of Chaplin's films under a category that corresponds to an era of the United States. According to Grace, seventy-nine percent of the themes in Chaplin's films are about relationships between the sexes. Those Love Pangs was placed under this category. There is some kind of a battle between the two sexes. Chaplin’s character fights for girls with the other gentlemen in the film.

Reviews

A reviewer from Motion Picture World wrote, "Charles Chaplin and Chester Conklin disport themselves in further love affairs in this number."

A reviewer from Bioscope wrote "The volatile Charlie succeeds in making himself agreeable to two ladies at a picture show, but his rivals succeed as usual in reducing him to a state of mental and physical collapse."

See also
 List of American films of 1914
 Charlie Chaplin filmography
 Making a Living

References

Bibliography
Neibaur, James L. “Chaplin at Keystone.” Cineaste 36, no. 2 (Spring 2011): 65–67.

External links

 
 
 

1914 films
1914 comedy films
Silent American comedy films
American silent short films
Short films directed by Charlie Chaplin
American black-and-white films
Keystone Studios films
Films produced by Mack Sennett
1914 short films
Articles containing video clips
1910s American films